Kanalkattakal is a 1978 Indian Malayalam-language action  film directed by A. B. Raj and produced by Thomas Abraham. The film stars Prem Nazir, Vincent, K. P. Ummer,  Jayabharathi, Adoor Bhasi and Thikkurissy Sukumaran Nair. The film has musical score by V. Dakshinamoorthy.

Cast
Prem Nazir as Vijayan/Panikkar (Double Roll)
Jayabharathi as Rajani
Adoor Bhasi as  Compounder
Thikkurissy Sukumaran Nair as Mental Doctor
Jose Prakash as Vikraman / Prasad
T. R. Omana as Lakshmi
Jayakumari
K. P. Ummer as James / Rajan
Paravoor Bharathan
Vincent as Maaran / Venu
 Prathapachandran as Moopan
 Maniyanpilla Raju as Man at mental hospital
 Manavalan
 Paul Vengola
 Kaduvakkulam Antony
 Thodupuzha Radhakrishnan
 Aravindhakshan
 Murali Menon
 Santo Krishnan
 Balan
 Sudeer Kumar
 Sadana
 Vijaya Lakshmi
 Prema
 Lissi
 Daisy
 Jayanthi
 Radha Devi
 Baby Babitha
 Baby Vandhana
 Baby Lakshmi
 Master kumar
 Master Rajkumar

Soundtrack
The music was composed by V. Dakshinamoorthy and the lyrics were written by Chirayinkeezhu Ramakrishnan Nair, Pappanamkodu Lakshmanan and P. Bhaskaran.

References

External links

youtube
 kanalkkattakal

1978 films
1970s Malayalam-language films